The 2017–18 Loyola Marymount Lions men's basketball team represented Loyola Marymount University during the 2017–18 NCAA Division I men's basketball season. The Lions were led by fourth-year head coach Mike Dunlap. They played their home games at Gersten Pavilion in Los Angeles, California as members of the West Coast Conference. They finished the season 11–20, 5–13 in WCC play to finish in eighth place. They defeated Portland in the first round of the WCC tournament before losing in the quarterfinals to Gonzaga.

Previous season
The Lions finished the 2016–17 season 15–15, 8–10 in WCC play to finish in sixth place. They lost in the quarterfinals of the WCC tournament to BYU.

Offseason

Departures

Incoming transfers

2017 recruiting class

Roster

Schedule and results

|-
!colspan=12 style=| Exhibition

|-
!colspan=12 style=| Non-conference regular season

|-
!colspan=12 style=|WCC regular season

|-
!colspan=12 style=| WCC tournament

Source

References

Loyola Marymount Lions men's basketball seasons
Loyola Marymount
Loyola Marymount basketball, men
Loyola Marymount basketball, men
Loyola Marymount basketball, men
Loyola Marymount basketball, men